NGC 814 is a lenticular galaxy in the constellation Cetus. It is estimated to be about 70 million light-years from the Milky Way and has a diameter of approximately 30,000 ly. NGC 814 was discovered on January 6, 1886 by the American astronomer Ormond Stone.

See also 
 List of NGC objects (1–1000)

References

External links 
 

Lenticular galaxies
0814
Cetus (constellation)
008319